NAIT station is an Edmonton Light Rail Transit station in Edmonton, Alberta. It serves the Metro Line. The station will be temporarily located north of Princess Elizabeth Avenue, on the south side of the Northern Alberta Institute of Technology's swimming pool and hockey arena wing, before a permanent station is ultimately built after a long-term comprehensive land use plan of the Edmonton City Centre Airport lands are finalized. NAIT station is the northern terminus of the Metro Line.

The station was closed for four months from April 28 to August 30, 2019 due to construction on the Capital Line which shares track with southern sections of the Metro Line. Because of delays that the construction is expected to cause, Edmonton Transit operated five car trains on the Metro Line. Since the NAIT station island platform is only 3 cars long, these larger trains were unable to fit alongside the platform, hence the temporary closure.

The station is currently being replaced by two different stations; NAIT and Blatchford Market, which construction was started on in 2020, which is located on the Blatchford lands.

History
Preliminary engineering of the line was completed July 2009 and construction of the phase from the MacEwan station to NAIT began in the summer of 2011. The station was supposed to open in 2014. However, due to delays it opened on September 6, 2015.

Station layout
NAIT Station is an at-grade station with a centre platform. Unlike the other LRT stations in Edmonton, the current platform at NAIT Station will only accommodate three-car trains. This is because it is a temporary station.

Around the station
Northern Alberta Institute of Technology
Alberta Aviation Museum
Kingsway Mall
Spruce Avenue
Westwood

References

Edmonton Light Rail Transit stations
Railway stations in Canada at university and college campuses
Northern Alberta Institute of Technology
Railway stations in Canada opened in 2015
Metro Line